Johann Joseph Peyritsch (20 October 1835 – 14 March 1889) was an Austrian physician and botanist born in Völkermarkt.

In 1864 he earned his medical doctorate from Vienna, and from 1866 to 1871 was associated with Vienna General Hospital. He later served as custos at the Naturhistorisches Museum in Vienna, and in 1878, succeeded Anton Kerner von Marilaun as professor of botany at the University of Innsbruck, a position he maintained until his death in 1889.

He was editor of Heinrich Wilhelm Schott's celebrated monograph on aroids, Aroideae Maximilianae, and with Theodor Kotschy (1813–1866), was co-author of Plantae Tinneanae, a book describing flora collected on the Tinne expedition to Sudan.

As a taxonomist, he described numerous plants from the botanical families Celastraceae and Erythroxylaceae. In the field of mycology, he held a special interest in the fungal order Laboulbeniales. The plant genus Peyritschia from the family Poaceae was named in his honor by Eugène Pierre Nicolas Fournier in 1881. Then in 1890, Roland Thaxter named a fungal genus Peyritschiella (in the family Laboulbeniaceae) after him.

References

Other sources
 Lexikon deutschsprachiger Bryologen by Jan-Peter Frahm & Jens Eggers, (biography in German)
  International Aroid Society, The Botanical Art of Schott's Aroideae Maximilianae

1835 births
1889 deaths
People from Völkermarkt
19th-century Austrian botanists
Academic staff of the University of Innsbruck
Austrian mycologists
Phycologists
Bryologists
Pteridologists